KQQN is a Christian radio station licensed to Nome, Alaska, broadcasting on 89.3 MHz FM. KQQN is owned by Nome Seventh-Day Adventist Church.

References

External links
Official Website

QQN